Tseng Yi-cheng (born 12 August 1978 in Taiwan) is a Taiwanese baseball player who currently coaches for Rakuten Monkeys of Chinese Professional Baseball League.

References 

1978 births
Living people
Baseball pitchers
People from Hsinchu County
Taiwanese baseball players
Uni-President 7-Eleven Lions players
Uni-President Lions players
Rakuten Monkeys coaches
Lamigo Monkeys coaches